Tributyltin oxide (TBTO) is an organotin compound chiefly used as a biocide (fungicide and molluscicide), especially a wood preservative. Its chemical formula is [(C4H9)3Sn]2O. It is a colorless viscous liquid.  It is poorly  soluble in water (20 ppm) but highly soluble in organic solvents. It is a potent skin irritant. 

Historically, tributyltin oxide's biggest application was as a marine anti-biofouling agent. Concerns over toxicity of these compounds have led to a worldwide ban by the International Maritime Organization. It is now considered a severe marine pollutant and a Substance of Very High Concern by the EU. Today, it is mainly used in wood preservation

References

External links 
 National Pollutant Inventory Fact Sheet for organotins
 

PBT substances
Fungicides
Molluscicides
Organotin compounds
Oxides
Tin(IV) compounds
Butyl compounds